Achim Pfuderer (born 29 November 1975 in Waiblingen) is a German former professional footballer who played as a defender. He made his debut on the professional league level in the 2. Bundesliga for Stuttgarter Kickers on 18 August 1996 when he came on as a half-time substitute in a game against VfB Oldenburg. He played three seasons in the Bundesliga for TSV 1860 Munich.

References

1975 births
Living people
People from Waiblingen
Sportspeople from Stuttgart (region)
German footballers
Stuttgarter Kickers players
TSV 1860 Munich players
1. FC Union Berlin players
SV Elversberg players
SV Darmstadt 98 players
Bundesliga players
2. Bundesliga players
SC Pfullendorf players
Association football defenders
Footballers from Baden-Württemberg